The United States' National Radar Cross-section Facility (commonly abbreviated as RATSCAT) is located at Holloman AFB, New Mexico.
The Lockheed Have Blue and Lockheed F-117 Nighthawk have been tested at this site.

References
Eglin AFB Public Affairs: "46th Test Wing Fact Sheet"

United States Air Force